William Peter Wingfield (born 7 May 1948) is an English record producer, keyboard player, songwriter, singer and music journalist.

Career
Whilst at Sussex University Wingfield and three other students formed the group Jellybread. In 1969, he played keyboards and sang on their First Slice album, which was produced by Mike Vernon for the Blue Horizon label.

In the 1970s, Wingfield was a specialist in soul music and regularly contributed articles and reviews to the monthly journal, "Let It Rock" and "Melody Maker". As a performer, he played with the British soul band Olympic Runners, and Albert Lee & Hogan's Heroes.

In 1971, Wingfield played the piano on the B.B. King in London album, and in the following year received similar credits for Seventy-Second Brave, the Keef Hartley Band album. Wingfield played keyboards on Bryn Haworth's 1974 album, Let the Days Go By and on his 1975 follow-up Sunny Side of the Street. In 1983, Wingfield played keyboards on Haworth's album, Pass It On. He also played on several albums by Colin Blunstone including his 1974 album Journey.

"Eighteen with a Bullet"
Wingfield hit the singles charts on both sides of the Atlantic in 1975 with "Eighteen with a Bullet," a pastiche doo-wop number involving word play on hit record chart positions—a bullet, in record-chart parlance, referring to a song still selling strongly and/or moving up the charts. It entered the Billboard Hot 100 chart on 23 August 1975.  On the Billboard Hot 100 for the week ending 22 November 1975, the tune lived up to its name by charting at no. 18, with a bullet. The song peaked at no. 15 a week later. It also reached no. 7 in the UK Singles Chart. while peaking at number 31 on the Australian charts in late 1975.  The song was Wingfield's only charting single in any of these three countries.

"Eighteen with a Bullet" featured on the only album Wingfield released, Breakfast Special, on Island label and also in 1975. A follow-up album, 'Love Bumps and Dizzy Spells', was never released.

"Eighteen with a Bullet" later featured on the soundtrack to the 1998 film, Lock, Stock and Two Smoking Barrels.

Later career
He played piano for the Alan Parsons rhythm section at Abbey Road Studios, with Pete Moss on bass guitar, for Dexys Midnight Runners and Paul McCartney.

In 1977, his song "Making a Good Thing Better" appeared on Olivia Newton-John's album of the same name. In 1978 he wrote an amusing cult dance hit for Patti LaBelle titled "Eyes in the Back of My Head", featured on her Tasty album. Wingfield also played keyboards with The Hollies during this period (1975-1980). In 1980, he produced Searching for the Young Soul Rebels the first album by Dexys Midnight Runners. In the 1980s, Wingfield teamed with the film producer Mel Brooks, and co-wrote the songs "It's Good to Be the King" and "To Be or Not to Be". In 1985, he produced the Kane Gang's debut album Bad and Lowdown World of the Kane Gang. Three years later his production credits appeared on The Proclaimers UK Top 20 hit "I'm Gonna Be" and their album Sunshine on Leith.

The Pasadenas 1988 song "Tribute (Right On)" was written by Wingfield.

Wingfield played with Van Morrison at the 1974 Montreux Jazz Festival, which was one of the two shows featured on Morrison's first DVD (2006). Several years later, Wingfield also did a summer tour of Europe with Morrison's band, featuring the songs from the latter's 1979 album, Into the Music. Beginning with their 1983 reunion shows, Wingfield spent 18 years handling keyboard duties for The Everly Brothers.

He also played on sessions for The Housemartins, Level 42 The Beautiful South, Van Morrison, Interview, Jimmy Witherspoon, Freddie King, Buddy Guy and Paul McCartney on his Run Devil Run album.

See also

List of 1970s one-hit wonders in the United States
List of performers on Top of the Pops
List of blue-eyed soul artists

References

External links
DMME.NET – An exclusive interview with Pete Sears
[ Allmusic – songs]

1948 births
Living people
People from Liphook
English record producers
English keyboardists
English songwriters
English music journalists
English male singers
Island Records artists
English session musicians
British male songwriters
Musicians from Hampshire